San Isidro, officially the Municipality of San Isidro (Surigaonon: Lungsod nan San Isidro), is a 5th class municipality in the province of Surigao del Norte, Philippines. According to the 2020 census, it has a population of 8,519 people.

History
Through Executive Order No. 359, issued by President Carlos P. Garcia on October 9, 1959, eight "barrios and sitios" of Numancia (later renamed Del Carmen) were organized into the municipality of San Isidro.

Geography

Barangays
San Isidro is politically subdivided into 12 barangays.
 Buhing Calipay
 Del Carmen (Poblacion) 
 Del Pilar 
 Macapagal 
 Pacifico 
 Pelaez 
 Roxas 
 San Miguel 
 Santa Paz 
 Santo Niño 
 Tambacan 
 Tigasao

Climate

Demographics

Economy

References

External links

 San Isidro Profile at PhilAtlas.com
   San Isidro Profile at the DTI Cities and Municipalities Competitive Index
 [ Philippine Standard Geographic Code]
 Philippine Census Information
 Local Governance Performance Management System

Municipalities of Surigao del Norte